Oui is a 1996 French comedy film, directed by Alexandre Jardin.

Plot
Nine friends revisit their sex life and rather than enjoy, trying to rejoice.

Cast

 Catherine Jacob as Nathalie
 Miguel Bosé as Hugo
 Chiara Caselli as Alice
 Pierre Palmade as Octave
 Jean-Marie Bigard as Stéphane
 Daniel Russo as Polo
 Dany Boon as Wilfried
 Claire Keim as Marie
 Roland Marchisio as Hervé
 Sylvie Loeillet as Agathe
 Agnès Soral
 Alexandre Jardin

References

External links

1996 films
1990s French-language films
1996 comedy films
French comedy films
1990s French films